Conversation with the Wind (Colloquio col Vento), or simply Conversation with the Wind, is a 1962 kinetic steel sculpture by Italian artist Pietro Consagra, installed at the Museum of Fine Arts, Houston's (MFAH) Lillie and Hugh Roy Cullen Sculpture Garden in the U.S. state of Texas. The sculpture measures 104 × 107 × 94 5/8 in. (264.2 × 271.8 × 240.4 cm). It was exhibited in Spoleto, Italy in 1962, and purchased by MFAH in 1963.

According to his daughter, Consagra proposed painting the badly rusted sculpture for restorative purposes.

See also

 1962 in art
 List of public art in Houston

References

1962 establishments in Texas
1962 sculptures
Kinetic sculptures in the United States
Lillie and Hugh Roy Cullen Sculpture Garden
Steel sculptures in Texas
Works by Italian people